Christopher Michael Ashworth (born March 13, 1975, in Farmville, Virginia), better known as simply Chris Ashworth, is an American actor, perhaps best known for his portrayal of Sergei Malatov on The Wire. He commonly plays characters from Eastern Europe due to his ability to mimic accents and dialects.

Ashworth began training in martial arts, particularly Muay Thai and Brazilian Jiu-Jitsu, in 1993. He also earned two Associates' degrees, Criminal Justice & General Studies, and a Bachelor's degree in Criminal Justice. He made his acting debut in 2000, in the low-budget sci-fi film Aquarius. He followed this up with a number of small roles in higher budget films such as Cecil B. DeMented, The Replacements and The Watcher before eventually landing a regular role on The Wire'''s second season in 2003. He has since appeared in numerous other films and television series including Without a Trace, The Lost Room and Terminator Salvation''.

Filmography

Film

Television

References

External links
 Official website
 

Living people
1975 births
20th-century American male actors
21st-century American male actors
American male film actors
American male television actors
Male actors from Virginia
American practitioners of Brazilian jiu-jitsu
Christians from Virginia
American Muay Thai practitioners
People from Farmville, Virginia